State Route 330 (SR 330) is a  state highway in the northeastern part of the U.S. state of Georgia. It travels through rural areas of Barrow and Jackson counties.

Route description
SR 330 begins at an intersection with SR 82 north of Statham, in Barrow County. This intersection also marks the northern terminus of Thurmond Road NE. It travels east-southeast and intersects Booth Road, where it curves to the east-northeast. Just before intersecting the southern terminus of Old Hunter Road, the highway curves back to the east-southeast. At that intersection, SR 330 enters Jackson County. Just past Lois Kinney Road, it passes the Mt. Tabor Cemetery. Farther to the east, it travels to the north of the Bear Creek Reservoir and curves to the northeast. The highway crosses over the Middle Oconee River and curves to the north-northeast, to meet its eastern terminus, an intersection with US 129/SR 15 Alt. (Jefferson Road) in Attica.

SR 330 is not part of the National Highway System, a system of roadways important to the nation's economy, defense, and mobility.

History

The road that eventually became SR 330 was built and paved in the early 1950s, along the same alignment as it travels today. By the middle of 1963, the entire roadway was designated as SR 330.

Major intersections

See also

References

External links

330
Transportation in Barrow County, Georgia
Transportation in Jackson County, Georgia